Sa. Ganesan (21 September 1930 – 13 April 2018) was an Indian politician of the Dravida Munnetra Kazhagam who served as mayor of Madras during 1970-71.

References

External links
 

1930 births
Mayors of Chennai
Dravida Munnetra Kazhagam politicians
2018 deaths